This family represents a Cardiovirus cis-acting replication element (CRE) which is located within the region encoding the capsid protein VP2 and is required for viral replication.

See also 
 Citrus tristeza virus replication signal
 Rubella virus 3' cis-acting element

References

External links 
 

Cis-regulatory RNA elements
Cardioviruses